Liyanage Boniface Walter Perera (born 5 June 1945), popularly known by his stage name Ravindra Randeniya, is a Sri Lankan actor and former politician. He rose to fame in Lester James Peries's film Desa Nisa in 1972, and was a popular actor during the 1970s and 1980s; He won the Sarasaviya Best Actor Award in 1984 (Dadayama), 1985 (Maya), 1989 (Sandakada Pahana), and 1990 (Sri Medura).

Randeniya hosted the quiz program Mind Star on ITN, which gain huge publicity.

Personal life
Randeniya was born in Dalugama, Kelaniya Sri Lanka in 1945 as the second child in a family with 6 siblings. His father, L.P. Perera was a well-known businessman in Dalugama, Kelaniya who was popular in the brass hinge industry. His mother was Caroline Egodawatte, born in Sapugaskanda. Ravindra has one elder brother: Callistus, two younger sisters: Gertie, Helen, and two younger brothers: Amal and Shantha.

Randeniya attended St. Benedict College in Kotahena. His beloved friend was his classmate Vijaya Kumaratunga. Though he was a good student, he failed to pass his A-level examination and didn't pursue higher education. Randeniya instead joined his family business of manufacturing hardware products.

Dalugama was a small village filled with paddy fields and streams. Randeniya appreciated nature growing up often spending evenings looking over the fields; he was also an avid reader from a young age immersing himself in the works of acclaimed Sinhala authors like Martin Wickremasinghe, Prof.Ediriweera Sarachchandra, Kumaratunga Munidasa, and Wimalaratne Kumaragama.

Randeniya is married to fellow actress Preethi Pramila Seneviratne, and the wedding ceremony was celebrated on 31 October 1974. They have two sons, Sachindra Nirmal andSameera Manabarana and one daughter Umayangana Indrachapa. Preethi Randeniya is a poet and an author of children's books.

Career
He gave priority to studies over art and at school, he acted as 'Kashyapa' in the school play Sigiriya Kashyapa. He excelled in writing short stories and won the first prize in the short story competition organized by the College Literary Society in 1962. Both Kumaratunga and Randeniya were introduced to art and literature by Wilfred Perera, a well-known school teacher and a staunch leftist who was the brother of dramatist Anthony C. Perera.

In his free time, Randeniya started taking courses in theater decor and screenwriting at Lionel Wendt Theatre Workshop. Randeniya became interested in acting while taking a required general acting class under Jagoda; he gradually became fascinated with the idea of acting over the two years he spent at the school. He joined the Lionel Wendt Art Gallery in 1969, to learn drama, screenplay, direction and stage decoration. Randeniya got his first starring role in the student production Mudu Puththu directed by Gallapaththi at the age of 25. Veteran photographer Ralex Ranasinghe baptized Boniface as 'Ravindra Randeniya'.

His performance in the film drew praise from well-known director Lester James Peries. He next appeared in Kalu Diya Dahara, considered "a watershed in the annals of Sinhala films", which dealt with a struggle between workers and administration in a tea plantation. It was made in 1971 and shown nationwide in 1974. Peries, who was a fan, picked Randeniya for one of the three main roles in Desa Nisa alongside Joe Abeywickrema and Sriyani Amarasena. This would be his breakthrough role, and established him as a popular actor when screened in 1972. The 1989 film Siri Medura is the most difficult film character played by Randeniya, the character of 'Sampath Hamu', a paralyzed man who is confined to a wheelchair after an accident and his whole body is paralyzed and unable to move his head. He later won the Sarasaviya Award for Best Actor for this role in 1990, naming him as the first unanimous decision of the jury without recommendation.

Political
Later Randeniya was elected to Sri Lanka Parliament for United National Party. He served as a member between 2000 - 2004.

Filmography

Teledramas 
 Deweni Gamana (2019)
 Ganga Addara 
 Kahala Nadaya (2000)
 Kula Kumariya (2007) as Edward Deraniyagala 
 Sherlock Holmes

Awards

Presidential Film Awards

|-
|| 1980 ||| Podi Malli || Merit Award ||  
|-
|| 1983 ||| Paramitha || Merit Award ||  
|-
|| 1984 ||| Dadayama || Best Actor ||

Sarasaviya Awards

|-
|| 1984 ||| Dadayama || Best Actor ||  
|-
|| 1985 ||| Maya || Best Actor ||  
|-
|| 1989 ||| Sandakada Pahana || Best Actor ||  
|-
|| 1990 ||| Siri Medura || Best Actor ||  
|-
|| 1996 ||| Seilama || Best Actor ||  
|-
|| 1998 ||| Bawa Duka || Best Supporting Actor ||

Sumathi Awards

|-
|| 2002 ||| Contribution to cinema || U.W. Sumathipala Lifetime||  
|-
|| 2011 ||| Mind Star quiz program || Jury Appreciation ||

Raigam Tele'es

|-
|| 2015 ||| Contribution to cinema || Prathibha Prabha Lifetime ||

Hiru Golden Film Awards

|-
|| 2016 ||| Contribution to cinema || Hiru Lifetime Achievement  ||

References

External links
Ravindra Randeniya's Biography in Sinhala Cinema Database
Official Website - National Film Corporation of Sri Lanka
sundaytimes

Living people
Sri Lankan male film actors
1945 births
Members of the 11th Parliament of Sri Lanka
Members of the 12th Parliament of Sri Lanka
Sri Lankan Roman Catholics
Sinhalese male actors